Vision Electronic Recording Apparatus (VERA) was an early analog recording videotape format developed from 1952 by the BBC under project manager Dr Peter Axon.

History
In order to record high frequencies, a tape must move rapidly with respect to the recording or playback head. The frequencies used by video signals are so high that the tape/head speed is on the order of several meters per second (tens of feet per second), an order of magnitude faster than professional analog audio tape recording.

VERA was capable of recording about 15 minutes (e.g. 4,572 meters) of 405-line black-and-white video per reel, and the picture tended to wobble because of some jitter (uneven speed) of the tape transport. Later video recorders used a time base corrector to remove this jitter and make synchronization with the studio house possible.

In order to cope with 625-line PAL or SECAM colour transmissions VERA would likely have required an even faster, and possibly unfeasible, tape speed.

Development began in 1952, but VERA was not perfected until 1958. It was given a live demonstration on-air on Panorama on April 14, 1958;  Richard Dimbleby, seated by a clock, talked for a couple of minutes about the new method of vision recording with instant playback, and then the tape was wound back and replayed. The picture was slightly watery, but reasonably watchable, and instant playback was something completely new.

However, by this time it had already been rendered obsolete by the Ampex quadruplex video recording system. The rapid tape-to-head speed of quadruplex videotape was achieved by spinning the heads rapidly on a drum: the system used, with variations, on all videotape systems ever since, as well as DAT.

The BBC scrapped VERA and quickly adopted the Ampex system. It has been suggested that the BBC only continued to develop VERA as a bargaining tool, so it would be offered some of the first Ampex machines produced in unstated exchange for abandoning further work on a potential rival, but the colossal disadvantages of VERA and its status as a technological dead-end make this seem highly unlikely.

See also 

 Helical scan

Notes

External links 
 BBC: The rise and rise of the video
 Oldboys article including instruction manual and film footage
 Chronomedia article
youtube.com VERA - Early Video Tape Recorder - Peter Axon interview 1958
videopreservation.conservation-us.org museum BBC's VERA (Vision Electronic Recording Apparatus)
 birth-of-tv.org VERA 1958: Vision Electronic Recording Apparatus
Introduction to the video recorder, National Science and Media Museum blog
youtube.com VERA
rfwilmut.net BROADCAST VIDEO RECORDING
The History of Television, 1942 to 2000,  By Albert Abramson, Christopher H. Sterling, page 83
youtube.com, Richard Dimbleby demonstrates the new BBC Vision Electronic Recording Apparatus in an edition of Panorama in April 1958.
Basic Radio & Television, 2/E,  By Sharma, page 447

Audiovisual introductions in 1952
Videotape
History of television